William Norrie  (January 21, 1929 – July 6, 2012) was the 39th Mayor of Winnipeg, Manitoba, and was a onetime Chancellor of the University of Manitoba. Norrie was also involved in various charities, and once chaired the United Way of Winnipeg's annual campaign.

In August 1992 Norrie's son Duncan was killed in a plane crash over Nepal. Duncan was honoured by having a street in Winnipeg named after him.

References

1929 births
2012 deaths
Canadian university and college chancellors
Members of the Order of Canada
Members of the Order of Manitoba
Members of the United Church of Canada
University of Manitoba alumni
Mayors of Winnipeg
Deaths from respiratory failure